Meropidia  is a genus of hoverflies in the subfamily Eristalinae.

Species
Meropidia flavens Ståhls & Hippa, 2013
Meropidia neurostigma Hippa, 1983
Meropidia nigropilosa Thompson, 1983
Meropidia nitida Morales, 2013
Meropidia rufa Thompson, 1983

References

Diptera of South America
Hoverfly genera
Eristalinae
Taxa named by F. Christian Thompson